Paavilainen is a Finnish surname. Notable people with the surname include:

 Simo Paavilainen (born 1944), Finnish architect
 Jorma Paavilainen (born 1960), Finnish chess problemist

See also
 Paavolainen

Finnish-language surnames